Zafar Iqbal may refer to:

 Zafar Iqbal (actor) (1950–1991/1992), Bangladeshi actor
 Zafar Iqbal (athlete) (born 1982), Pakistani triple jumper
 Zafar Iqbal (cricketer) (born 1969), Pakistani cricketer
 Zafar Iqbal (field hockey) (born 1956), Indian field hockey player
 Zafar Iqbal (Guantanamo detainee 014), Pakistani detained by the U.S. 2002–2004
 Zafar Iqbal (poet) (born 1932/1933), Pakistani Urdu poet
 Zafar Iqbal (politician) (born 1959), Pakistani politician in the Punjab
 Zafar Iqbal (umpire) (born 1947), Pakistani cricketer and umpire 
 Muhammed Zafar Iqbal (born 1952), Bangladeshi science fiction writer and scientist